Ali Hüryılmaz (born 29 January 1945) is a Turkish former cyclist. He competed in the individual road race and team time trial events at the 1972 Summer Olympics.

References

External links
 

1945 births
Living people
Turkish male cyclists
Olympic cyclists of Turkey
Cyclists at the 1972 Summer Olympics
Place of birth missing (living people)
Presidential Cycling Tour of Turkey winners
20th-century Turkish people